Patricia Ferrando is an Italian and Venezuelan dressage rider. She competed at the 2019 Pan American Games in Lima where she became 12th in the finals and at the 2015 Pan-American Games in Toronto. She won a golden team medal at the 2009 Bolivarian Games, with the Venezuelan team. She is currently the most successful dressage rider from Venezuela.

In 2019 Patricia tried to qualify for the Olympic Games in Tokyo 2020 under supervision of her trainer Yvonne Losos de Muñiz and competed at several international competitions in Europe, including Denmark, the Netherlands, Austria and Spain. Patricia qualified Venezuela as first reserve country from Group D & E (North America, Central and South America) following the FEI regulations for the Olympic Games.

References 

Living people
Venezuelan dressage riders
1985 births
Equestrians at the 2019 Pan American Games
Equestrians at the 2015 Pan American Games
Female equestrians
Pan American Games competitors for Venezuela
Venezuelan sportspeople
Venezuelan people of Italian descent